West Yorkshire Police is the territorial police force responsible for policing the metropolitan county of West Yorkshire, England.  It is the fourth largest territorial police force in England and Wales by number of officers.

History
West Yorkshire Police was formed in 1974, when part of the West Yorkshire Constabulary (itself created in 1968, and covering a much larger area) was amalgamated with the Leeds City Police and Bradford City Police, under the Local Government Act 1972.  The force was originally known as the West Yorkshire Metropolitan Police. Some older signs around the Force area, such as the one in the reception of Millgarth Police Station in Leeds city centre, read 'West Yorkshire Metropolitan Police'. The 'Metropolitan' from the police title was dropped in 1986 when the metropolitan county councils were abolished.
Proposals made by the Home Secretary on 21 March 2006 would see the force merge with North Yorkshire Police, South Yorkshire Police and Humberside Police to form a strategic police force for the entire region. This did not take place.

On 12 December 2006, Sir Norman Bettison was announced as the new chief constable, replacing Colin Cramphorn and resigned from his post on 24 October 2012. He was replaced by Temporary Chief Constable John Parkinson until the appointment of Mark Gilmore as chief constable on 1 February 2013.

In 2018, it was reckoned West Yorkshire Police would lose 400 officers from its 4,800 officers due to austerity.

Operational structure

For operational purposes West Yorkshire Police is divided into five geographic divisions known within the force as ‘policing districts’. The change in nomenclature reflects that of April 2014 the alignment with council boundaries for policing districts and the reduction of divisions in Leeds (which had three) and Bradford (which had two) so that each policing district was conterminous with its respective local authority boundaries. Each district is made up of Partnership Working Areas (PWA) which consist of an Inspector and three teams of sergeants, police constables, special constables and PCSOs.  The first single police commander of the Bradford district, Chief Superintendent Simon Atkin, was appointed in October 2013 as part of ongoing moves to merge the district’s two policing divisions, while Chief Superintendent Angela Williams was appointed in Calderdale.

The five existing divisions with their divisional identifiers are as follows:

The force headquarters is situated on Laburnum Road to the north of Wakefield city centre along with the Learning and Development Centre and specialist operations facility at Carr Gate, Wakefield at Junction 41 of the M1 motorway.

The Sir Alec Jeffreys Building in the Calder Park Business Estate (at Junction 39 of the M1 motorway) houses the Yorkshire and The Humber Scientific Support Service and was opened in May 2012 by Sir Alec Jeffreys himself. West Yorkshire Police is the 'lead force' for scientific support and provides such services for North Yorkshire Police, South Yorkshire Police and Humberside Police.

Estate

The current estate of police stations and other buildings is changing with certain buildings closing and new buildings opening. , there are three PFI projects completed and as a result of these new buildings a number of police stations have closed and been sold.

Wakefield district police headquarters is now located on Havertop Lane, Normanton. As a result of its construction, police stations in Wood Street, Wakefield,
Normanton, 
and Castleford were closed.

The new headquarters for the newly formed Leeds district is operational on Elland Road, Beeston, Leeds. It replaced Millgarth,  
and Holbeck police stations in Leeds.

The existing operational support facilities at Carr Gate, Wakefield were expanded and new buildings constructed which provide centralised specialist training for the force in one location. The new facility, which totals  includes:
Training hub facility (reception, classrooms, three gyms, storage and offices etc.)
Public order training facility (storage areas, breakout areas, large briefing room, classroom, training arena, etc.)
Driver training facility
Firearms training facility   and two  firing ranges, armoury, etc.
Method of entry area  approximately

Leadership

List of chief constables
West Riding Constabulary
 Major-General Llewellyn William Atcherley (1908-1919)
 Captain Henry Studdy (1944 to 1959)
 George Edward Scott (1959 to 1969)
West Yorkshire Constabulary (1968)
 Ronald Gregory (1969 to 1983)
West Yorkshire Police (1974)
 Sir Colin Sampsom (1983 to 1988)
 Peter Nobes (1988 to 1993)
 Keith Hellawell (1993 to 1998)
 Alan Charlesworth (1998 to 1999)
 Graham Moore (1999 to 2002)
 Colin Cramphorn (September 2002 to November 2006)
 Sir Norman Bettison (January 2007 to October 2012)
 Mark Gilmore (April 2013 to August 2016)
 Dee Collins (appointed November 2016) [temporary chief constable between June 2014 and November 2016]
 John Robins (appointed June 2019)

Police and crime commissioner
From November 2012 until May 2021, the  West Yorkshire Police and Crime Commissioners was Mark Burns-Williamson.
In 2021, his role was abolished when Tracy Brabin was elected Mayor of West Yorkshire and assumed responsibility for the force.

PEEL inspection
Her Majesty's Inspectorate of Constabulary and Fire & Rescue Services (HMICFRS) conducts a periodic police effectiveness, efficiency and legitimacy (PEEL) inspection of each police service's performance. In its latest PEEL inspection,  was rated as follows:

Notable cases
The hunt for the Yorkshire Ripper (1975 to 1981)
Chapeltown riots (1975, 1981 and 1987)
Bradford riots (2001)
Harehills riot (2001)
Hunt for murderer David Bieber (2003)
The disappearance of Shannon Mathews (2008)
The murder of Jo Cox, MP (2016)
Assault on Syrian refugees, Almondbury Community School (2018)

Officers killed in the line of duty

The Police Roll of Honour Trust and Police Memorial Trust list and commemorate all British police officers killed in the line of duty. Since its establishment in 1984, the Police Memorial Trust has erected 50 memorials nationally to some of those officers.

Since 1900, the following officers of West Yorkshire Police are listed by the Trust as having died during the course of their duties in attempting to prevent, stop or solve a criminal act:
PC Mark Goodlad, 2011, (Assisting motorist on M1 when a HGV struck him and his marked police vehicle)
PC Conal Daood Hills, 2006 (fatally injured when his vehicle crashed during a police pursuit)
PC Sharon Beshenivsky, 2005 (shot dead attending a robbery)
PC Ian Nigel Broadhurst, 2003 (shot dead by David Bieber)
PC David Sykes, July 1986, struck by a lorry whilst on the hard shoulder of the M62 near Brighouse
Sergeant John Richard Speed, 1984 (shot dead; posthumously awarded the Queen's Commendation for Brave Conduct)
Sergeant Michael Hawcroft, 1981 (stabbed; posthumously awarded the Queen's Commendation for Brave Conduct)
Inspector Barry John Taylor, 1970 (shot dead; posthumously awarded the Queen's Commendation for Brave Conduct)

Arms

See also
Law enforcement in the United Kingdom
List of law enforcement agencies in the United Kingdom
Table of police forces in the United Kingdom

References

External links

 West Yorkshire Police at HMICFRS
 

P
Police forces of England
Organizations established in 1974
1974 establishments in England
Crime in West Yorkshire